Amit Kavthekar (born 11 August 1984) is an Indian tabla player known as the last ganda-bandhan (ordained disciple) of Utd. Allarakha Khansaheb and a prominent disciple of Utd. Zakir Hussain. Kavthekar is regarded as one of the leading young artists of Indian Classical music and tabla.

Background
Kavthekar was born and raised in the Shivaji Park neighborhood of Mumbai to a Deshastha Brahmin family. His father is acclaimed rangoli artist Suhas Kavthekar. He attended Balmohan Vidyamandir in Dadar, and graduated from Ruparel College.

Musical training
Regarded as a child prodigy, Kavthekar (aged 6) was brought before Ustad Alla Rakha for consideration as a disciple. At age 11, he became a ganda-bandhan (ordained) disciple of Allarakha in a ceremony attended by Pt. Bhai Gaitonde, Pt. Suresh Talwalkar, Taufiq Qureshi, and Aditya Kalyanpur. After Khansaheb's death in 2000, Kavthekar continued his training exclusively with Utd. Zakir Hussain, though he had been learning with him since age 7. He has also studied the nuances of tabla with Deepak Nerurkar and Pt. Sudhir Mainkar.

Aesthetics
Kavthekar's playing style is based on the Punjab baaj with influences from Delhi baaj and contemporary tabla players, particularly Zakir Hussain. His style is regarded as sensitive.

Career
Kavthekar's performing career began in the early-2000s in Mumbai. He performed alongside Zakir Hussain and Sivamani for Zee TV on Indian television. He also appeared in Jabbar Patel's documentary about Pt. Shivkumar Sharma, accompanying the maestro in concert.

Performances
As an accompanist, Kavthekar has performed with prominent musicians like Ravi Chary, Ronu Majumdar, Shahid Parvez, Amjad Ali Khan, Pandit Jasraj, and Lata Mangeshkar. He has also performed with Shahid Parvez at the Berklee College of Music, Utd. Aashish Khan at LearnQuest Academy of Music's Annual Conference at Regis College, Pt. Buddhadev Dasgupta, Pt. Kushal Das at the MIT's Wong Auditorium, Smt. Ashwini Bhide-Deshpande, and Ken Zuckerman among others.

As an ensemble player, Kavthekar has played in jazz and fusion groups in the United States and India. He has also played in Chicago's World Music Festival with Josh Feinberg and Kunal Gunjal. Since 2019, he has performed in the ensemble quartet Purna Loka with Purnaprajna Bangere, Jeff Harshbarger, and David Balakrishnan.

In 2018, he accompanied Amjad Ali Khan, Ayaan Ali Bangash, and Amaan Ali Bangash at the UN Day concert in New York City, before the General Assembly, in honor of Mahatma Gandhi's legacy.

Beginning in 2021, Kavthekar began touring with guitarist Al Di Meola.

In 2022, Kavthekar made his debut at the prestigious Sawai Gandharva Sangeet Mahotsav, accompanying Amjad Ali Khan with Anubrata Chatterjee.

In 2022, Kavthekar made his debut at the prestigious Harballabh Sangeet Sammelan, accompanying Anupama Bhagwat.

Teaching
Kavthekar has given musical lectures around the world and is currently a visiting professor at Salem State University. After settling in Boston, Kavthekar became leading faculty of the New England School of Music (NESOM) where he actively teaches tabla to dozens of students. He also teaches tabla at the American School of Bombay. Among his disciples includes the prodigy, Keshava.

Awards and recognition
Kavthekar was awarded the Taal–Mani by Sur Singar Samiti in Mumbai.

References

1984 births
Living people
Indian drummers
Musicians from Mumbai
Tabla players
Hindustani instrumentalists
Jazz fusion musicians
World music musicians
Indian male classical musicians
Indian male composers
21st-century drummers
21st-century male musicians
Male jazz musicians